The 2020 IIHF World Championship would have been hosted by Switzerland from 8 to 24 May 2020, as the IIHF announced on 15 May 2015 in Prague, Czech Republic.

The tournament was cancelled on 21 March 2020 due to the COVID-19 pandemic.

Venues

Participants
Qualified as host

 Automatic qualifier after a top 14 placement at the 2019 IIHF World Championship

Qualified through winning a promotion at the 2019 IIHF World Championship Division I

Seeding
The seedings in the preliminary round are based on the 2019 IIHF World Ranking, as of the end of the 2019 IIHF World Championship, using the serpentine system.

Group A (Lausanne)
 (1)
 (4)
 (5)
 (7)
 (9)
 (12)
 (14)
 (20)

Group B (Zürich)
 (2)
 (3)
 (6)
 (8)
 (10)
 (11)
 (16)
 (19)

Match officials
16 referees and linesmen were announced on 25 February 2020.

Preliminary round
The schedule was announced on 1 August 2019.

Group A

Standings
<onlyinclude>

Matches

Group B

Standings

Matches

Playoff round

Bracket
There will be a re-seeding after the quarterfinals.

All times are local (UTC+2).

Quarterfinals

Semifinals

Bronze medal game

Gold medal game

References

External links
Official website

 
2020 Men
IIHF World Championship
IIHF World Championship
2020 IIHF World Championship
2020 IIHF World Championship
2020 IIHF World Championship
IIHF World Championship
21st century in Zürich
21st century in Lausanne
IIHF World Championship